Rexer may refer to:

 Ernst Rexer (1902–1983), a German nuclear physicist
 Fred Rexer, a U.S. Army Vietnam combat veteran and Hollywood actor and screenwriter
 Rexer Ltd., an automobile manufacturing company in Estonia
 Rexer's Annual Data Miner Survey
 The British copy of the Madsen machine gun